The 2020 Bluebird Aviation Crash refers to the Bluebird Aviation Dash 8-Q400F cargo plane, which crashed in Somalia on 14 July 2020.

Cause 
The cargo flight, which took off from Djibouti was carrying humanitarian aid and supplies for the African Union Mission In Somalia following recent floods to Beledweyne Airport, Somalia when a donkey ran across the runway. Avoiding hitting the donkey, the pilot ended up impacting a ditch next to the runway before it caught fire.

All three crew members on board escaped without sustaining serious injury.

References 

2020 disasters in Somalia
Aviation accidents and incidents in 2020
Aviation accidents and incidents in Somalia